Onde (Waves) is a 2005 Italian romance film directed by Francesco Fei.

Plot 
In Genoa Francesca, a girl with a purplish birthmark on his left cheek, and Luca, a blind musician, live lonely lives marked by a deep unhappiness. Their casual meeting at the Aquarium of Genoa will give rise to a tormented love story.

Cast 

Anita Caprioli as Francesca
Ignazio Oliva as  Luca
Filippo Timi as  Alex
 Marina Remi as  Marina

See also  
 List of Italian films of 2005

References

External links

2005 films
Italian romantic drama films
2005 romantic drama films
Films about blind people
Films set in Genoa
2005 directorial debut films
2000s Italian films